The Willow Brook is a tributary of the River Nene. Its entire course is in the English county of Northamptonshire.

The Willow Brook rises north of Corby where, until 1980, water was extracted for use at Corby Steelworks. It then flows through or near Deene, Bulwick, Blatherwycke, King's Cliffe and Woodnewton and joins the Nene downstream from Fotheringhay.

Rivers of Northamptonshire